Callaghan College is a large multi-campus government-funded co-educational comprehensive secondary day school, located in the north-western corridor of Newcastle, New South Wales, Australia.

Before 2020, the Waratah campus operated as a specialist school for technology students.

In 2018, across all three campuses, the College had an enrolment of approximately 2,500 students, of whom thirteen percent identified as Indigenous Australians and thirteen percent were from a language background other than English. Across all three campuses, the 2300 students are supported by approximately 300 staff. The College is run and administered by the New South Wales Department of Education. The College Principal is Ms Kylee Owen and each campus has a principal.

History 
A 1999 analysis of School Certificate and Higher School Certificate results and other data including demographic studies, enrolment and exit destination statistics at the Jesmond High School, Wallsend High School and Waratah High School, revealed many similarities and patterns of results. Following consultation with parents, citizens, staff and students, the Government of New South Wales made a decision to merge the three schools and establish Callaghan under a collegiate structure.

The Waratah Campus was originally occupied by Newcastle Boys' High School, a selective single sex high school for boys that operated on the site from 1934 to the end of 1976. At the beginning of 1976 the school became non-selective and co-educational for students in years 7–11, and in 1977 changed its name to Waratah High School. Later the name was changed to Waratah Technology High School, which persisted until the change to Waratah Technology Campus in 2000 upon the formation of Callaghan College. It changed names again in 2020 to just Waratah Campus. Despite numerous other changes, the school retains the original Newcastle Boys' High School house names of Hannell Devils (red), Hunter Tigers (yellow), Shortland Vipers (green), and Smith Sharks (blue).

At the start of 2020, a re-branding occurred. The old 3 ring logo was replaced with 3 white or navy blue circles. The campus main colours were changed: Jesmond - black to yellow, Wallsend - Dark blue to a brighter blue and Waratah - Maroon to a brighter red.

See also 

 List of government schools in New South Wales
 Education in Australia

References

Further reading

External links 
 
 
 
 
 

2000 establishments in Australia
Educational institutions established in 2000
Public high schools in New South Wales
Education in Newcastle, New South Wales